R156 can refer to:

The R156 road (Ireland)
The MPI MP8AC-3 locomotive, designated R156 by the New York City Subway system, its first customer.